"My Love Is A Fire" is a pop song performed by Donny Osmond.  The song was the first single released from the October 1990 Donny Osmond album Eyes Don't Lie.  The single reached #21 in the Billboard Hot 100 chart in 1990.

Donny Osmond songs
1990 songs
1990 singles
Song articles with missing songwriters